The 1987 NCAA Division I men's basketball tournament involved 64 schools playing in single-elimination play to determine the national champion of men's  NCAA Division I college basketball. It began on March 12, 1987, and ended with the championship game on March 30 in New Orleans, Louisiana. A total of 63 games were played.

Indiana, coached by Bob Knight, won the national title with a 74–73 victory in the final game over Syracuse, coached by Jim Boeheim. Keith Smart of Indiana, who hit the game-winner in the final seconds, and intercepted the full court pass at the last second, was named the tournament's Most Outstanding Player. 

The tournament also featured a "Cinderella team" in the Final Four, as Providence College, led by a then-unknown Rick Pitino, made their first Final Four appearance since 1973.  

One year after reaching the Final Four as a #11 seed, LSU made another deep run as a #10 seed in the Midwest region. The Tigers ousted #2 seed Temple in the second round and #3 seed DePaul in the Sweet 16 before losing 77-76 to top seeded Indiana in the Elite Eight. 

This was the last tournament in which teams were allowed to have home court advantage: national runner-up Syracuse (2E), DePaul (3MW), Arizona (10W) and UAB (11SE) all opened the tournament playing on their home courts. UAB and Arizona each lost in the first round, while DePaul won twice at the Rosemont Horizon. Under rules adopted in 1988, teams cannot play in a facility in which they play four or more regular season games. 

The 1987 NCAA men's basketball tournament was also the first tournament to use the three-point shot.

Schedule and venues

The following are the sites that were selected to host each round of the 1987 tournament:

First and Second Rounds
March 12 and 14
East Region
 Charlotte Coliseum, Charlotte, North Carolina (Host: University of North Carolina at Charlotte)
Midwest Region
 Hoosier Dome, Indianapolis, Indiana (Hosts: Butler University, Midwestern Collegiate Conference)
Southeast Region
 Birmingham-Jefferson Civic Center Coliseum, Birmingham, Alabama (Host: Southeastern Conference)
West Region
 Jon M. Huntsman Center, Salt Lake City, Utah (Host: University of Utah)
March 13 and 15
East Region
 Carrier Dome, Syracuse, New York (Host: Syracuse University)
Midwest Region
 Rosemont Horizon, Rosemont, Illinois (Host: DePaul University)
Southeast Region
 Omni Coliseum, Atlanta, Georgia (Host: Georgia Institute of Technology)
West Region
 McKale Center, Tucson, Arizona (Host: University of Arizona)

Regional semifinals and finals (Sweet Sixteen and Elite Eight)
March 19 and 21
East Regional, Brendan Byrne Arena, East Rutherford, New Jersey (Hosts: Seton Hall University, Big East Conference)
Southeast Regional, Freedom Hall, Louisville, Kentucky (Host: University of Louisville)
March 20 and 22
Midwest Regional, Riverfront Coliseum, Cincinnati, Ohio (Hosts: University of Cincinnati, Xavier University)
West Regional, Kingdome, Seattle, Washington (Host: University of Washington)

National semifinals and championship (Final Four and championship)
March 28 and 30
Louisiana Superdome, New Orleans, Louisiana (Host: Tulane University)

For the second time, the Louisiana Superdome hosted the Final Four. There were four domed stadiums in the 1987 tournament, including Indianapolis, New Orleans, Seattle and Syracuse. There were two new venues, the Hoosier Dome in Indianapolis and the Rosemont Horizon, located in suburban Chicago. This marked the first time the Tournament returned to the Chicago area in twenty years. This also marked the last appearance of the original Charlotte Coliseum, moving to the new Coliseum in 1991.

Teams

Bracket
* – Denotes overtime period

East Regional – East Rutherford, New Jersey

Regional Final Summary

Southeast Regional – Louisville, Kentucky

Regional Final Summary

Midwest Regional – Cincinnati, Ohio

West Regional – Seattle, Washington

Final Four – New Orleans, Louisiana

Game Summaries

National Championship

Trivia
 The 59th Academy Awards show was broadcast on the ABC network at the same time as CBS network broadcast of the championship game between Indiana and Syracuse. Oscars show host Chevy Chase quipped later in the evening, "Is the game over yet?" The Oscars show would subsequently be scheduled around the tournament broadcast by moving it later in April for two years.
 Tenth seeded LSU reached the Elite Eight for the second straight year without being favored to win a game. This time, the Tigers did not have the advantage of playing their first and second round games on their home court. They had previously reached the Final Four as an 11-seed in 1986, losing to eventual national champion Louisville Cardinals. The Tigers missed a shot at the buzzer and fell short of another trip to the Final Four, losing 77-76 to eventual national champion Indiana. It marked the fifth time in seven tournament appearances between 1979 and 1987 LSU was eliminated by the eventual national champion. The Tigers did not reach the  Elite Eight again until 2006 . 
 This marked the first time that CBS Sports used "One Shining Moment" during their tournament epilogue. Initially, the song was supposed to have been played after Super Bowl XXI (which was also aired on CBS), but due to time constraints, its debut was delayed until the national championship game. The opening words for the football version were "The ball is kicked"; in the reworked version, the word "kicked" was changed to "tipped" to suit the tournament.
 The three losing coaches in the Final Four all eventually won national titles. Jerry Tarkanian was the first to do so, winning in 1990 with UNLV defeating the Duke University Blue Devils 103–73.  The following year 1991, Duke defeated UNLV in the national semi-final game to end UNLV's chance to finish undefeated.  Rick Pitino followed in 1996 with Kentucky, defeating Jim Boeheim's Syracuse team in the final. Boeheim would win in 2003 with Syracuse by defeating the University of Kansas Jayhawks.  
 There were no teams from the Metro Conference, Big South Conference or Gulf Star Conference in the tournament.  The Metro Conference allowed Memphis State, which was serving an NCAA tournament ban that year, to compete in its conference tournament, which it won by defeating the defending 1986 National Champion Louisville Cardinals by the lopsided score 75 to 52 on the Cardinals' home court, Freedom Hall in Louisville, Kentucky.  The NCAA basketball tournament committee said as the conference had committed its automatic berth would go to its conference tournament winner, the conference lost its automatic berth that year, and no other schools received an at-large entry.  Most conferences now prohibit teams on postseason bans from participating in conference tournaments as a result, or have provisional automatic bids awarded to the eligible team that advanced the most. The Gulf Star and Big South did not have automatic bids to the tournament because many of the schools in these conferences were transitioning from other divisions.
 During the selection show, there was a spot left open for the #12 seed in the Southeast Region. Kansas, the 5th seed in the region, was due to face either Washington or Houston in the first round. Washington was facing UCLA in the finals of the Pac-10 tournament at the time the selections were announced. UCLA held on to defeat Washington 76-62, putting Houston into the field of 64.

Announcers
CBS Studio Hosts: 
Jim Nantz and James Brown 
ESPN studio hosts: 
John Saunders (daytime), Bob Ley (primetime) and Dick Vitale 
Brent Musburger and Billy Packer – First round (Virginia–Wyoming) at Salt Lake City, Utah; Second Round at Indianapolis, Indiana and Rosemont, Illinois; East Regional at East Rutherford, New Jersey; Midwest Regional Final at Cincinnati, Ohio; Final Four at New Orleans, Louisiana
Dick Stockton and Tom Heinsohn – First (Oklahoma–Tulsa) and Second Rounds at Tucson, Arizona; Southeast Regional semifinal (Georgetown–Kansas) and Regional Final at Louisville, Kentucky
Verne Lundquist and Billy Cunningham – Second Round at Charlotte, North Carolina and Atlanta, Georgia; Midwest Regional semifinal (Duke-Indiana) at Cincinnati, Ohio; West Regional Final at Seattle, Washington
Tom Hammond and Larry Conley – Southeast Regional semifinal (Alabama–Providence) at Louisville, Kentucky
Mike Patrick and Jack Givens - Midwest Regional semifinal (LSU-DePaul) at Cincinnati, Ohio
Tim Brant and Bill Raftery – Second Round at Syracuse, New York; West Regional semifinals at Seattle, Washington
Mike Patrick and Larry Conley – First (Alabama–North Carolina A&T, Providence–UAB) and Second Rounds at Birmingham, Alabama
Gary Bender and Hubie Brown – Second Round at Salt Lake City, Utah
Jim Thacker and Jack Givens – First round (North Carolina–Pennsylvania, TCU–Marshall) at Charlotte, North Carolina
Frank Herzog and Bucky Waters – First round (Notre Dame–Middle Tennessee State, Navy–Michigan) at Charlotte, North Carolina
Mike Gorman and Ron Perry – First round (Syracuse–Georgia Southern, Purdue–Northeastern) at Syracuse, New York
Phil Stone and Bill Raftery – First round (Florida–N.C. State, West Virginia–Western Kentucky) at Syracuse, New York
John Sanders and Joe Dean – First round (Georgetown–Bucknell) at Atlanta, Georgia
John Sanders and Dave Gavitt – First round (Kentucky–Ohio State) at Atlanta, Georgia
Fred White and Joe Dean – First round (Kansas–Houston) at Atlanta, Georgia
Fred White and Dave Gavitt – First round (Clemson–SW Missouri State) at Atlanta, Georgia
Bob Rathbun and Dan Bonner – First round (Illinois–Austin Peay, New Orleans–Brigham Young) at Birmingham, Alabama
Tom Hammond and Jim Gibbons – First round (Indiana–Fairfield, Missouri–Xavier) at Indianapolis, Indiana
Ralph Hacker and John Laskowski – First round (Duke–Texas A&M, Auburn–San Diego) at Indianapolis, Indiana
Mick Hubert and Gary Thompson – First round (Temple–Southern, DePaul–Louisiana Tech) at Rosemont, Illinois
Wayne Larrivee and Bob Ortegel – First round (St. John's–Wichita State, Georgia Tech–LSU) at Rosemont, Illinois
Frank Fallon and Lynn Shackelford – First round (UNLV–Idaho State) at Salt Lake City, Utah
Bob Carpenter and Irv Brown – First round (UCLA–Central Michigan, Georgia–Kansas State) at Salt Lake City, Utah
Pete Solomon and Bruce Larson – First round (Iowa–Santa Clara) at Tucson, Arizona
Ted Robinson and Dan Belluomini – First round (Pittsburgh–Marist, UTEP–Arizona) at Tucson, Arizona

See also
 1987 NCAA Division II men's basketball tournament
 1987 NCAA Division III men's basketball tournament
 1987 NCAA Division I women's basketball tournament
 1987 NCAA Division II women's basketball tournament
 1987 NCAA Division III women's basketball tournament
 1987 National Invitation Tournament
 1987 National Women's Invitation Tournament
 1987 NAIA Division I men's basketball tournament
 1987 NAIA Division I women's basketball tournament

References

NCAA Division I men's basketball tournament
Ncaa
Basketball competitions in New Orleans
NCAA Division I men's basketball tournament
NCAA Division I men's basketball tournament
1980s in New Orleans
College sports tournaments in Louisiana